Randy Feltface, mostly referred to merely as Randy, or, on occasion, Randy the Purple Puppet, is an Australian puppet comedian. Randy is a fixture on the international stand-up circuit, and makes regular guest appearances on Australian television. He also performs as one half of the musical comedy duo "Sammy J and Randy", who made their television sitcom debut in 2015 with Sammy J & Randy in Ricketts Lane on ABC in Australia, for which Randy is credited as co-writer and lead actor. In 2019, Randy competed in the American reality television comedy competition series Bring the Funny, making it to the second round (the "Comedy Clash").

Fictography 
Randy notes that he has an unusually elaborate life story for a puppet comedian, though McIvor has stated that it has changed over time and that Randy sometimes makes new claims about his life in an improvisational manner.

Early stand-up career 
Randy's first acting gig was in a presentation on workplace bullying. Having gained a taste for showbiz, he soon began to make occasional appearances on the stand-up circuit in around 2005. Randy and Sammy J first met when they shared a bill; shortly after they began performing together at the Butterfly Club in South Melbourne as Sammy J & Randy.
Randy's first full length solo show was Randy's Postcards from Purgatory, which debuted at the Melbourne International Comedy Festival in 2009 to critical acclaim.

Personal life 
In his first full length show, Randy's Postcards from Purgatory, Randy revealed he was 38 years old, working children's parties on the weekend, going broke, and facing an impending divorce. He was also a heavy drinker and smoker. By the time of Randy is Sober it appears that Randy has quit drinking and smoking, and is now a vegan. He has also written an unpublished novel entitled "Walking to Skye", a recurring topic of interest in his 2015/2016 solo show Randy Writes a Novel.

During the events depicted in the second show, Ricketts Lane, Randy is sent to jail for tax fraud, thanks to his house-mate, Sammy J, a young lawyer desperate to make a case. However, McIvor noted that both Randy and Sammy J are actors on that show.

In his show Purple Privilege, Randy says he was born on the "day Lindy Chamberlain's baby was eaten by a dingo" (17 August, 1980).

Creation
Randy Feltface is operated by Heath McIvor,  who began his career in puppetry at age 13 in 1993, when he performed with the Melbourne children's theatre company Polyglot Theatre. He provided puppetry work for The Hobbit, The Lion, the Witch and the Wardrobe and Walking With Dinosaurs, the Live Experience. He has also worked in television on Pig's Breakfast, Li'l Horrors, and as 'Fiend' in Me and My Monsters.

McIvor and his friend Philip Millar were working on a puppet musical called Tyrannosaurus Sex with a mutual friend Derek Rowe; Rowe, who worked as a workplace consultant for companies, was eventually contracted to create a show about workplace bullying by an insurance company. The show, entitled What's A Bully To You?, originally featured two puppets, but the team realized they needed a third, unisex puppet that could perform a male and a female role depending on the costume: the puppet, called "Beverly" and "Randy" depending on the role, was built by Millar, made from  tools in his shed, his arm rods being hacked together from barbecue forks. The show was not received well by the company, and McIvor decided to use the character and puppet for an upcoming puppet comedy show organized by Millar called Pure Puppet Palaver, rebranding it as a stand-up comedy act.

Style

When performing with Sammy J, Randy performs the funny-man to Sammy J's straight-man in the double act, and much of their material is musical comedy. In his solo performances, Randy tends towards observational comedy; in both Randy is Sober and Randy Writes a Novel, he contemplates his own progression as a person and his existential crisis as an artist. He often breaks the fourth wall, pointing out that he is a puppet and cannot actually see the audience, or noting that his movement on stage is usually limited to the desk he is behind.

Works

Live shows 
2009 Randy's Postcards From Purgatory
2010 Ricketts Lane (with Sammy J)
2011 Bin Night (with Sammy J)
2011–2013 Randy is Sober 
2012 The Inheritance (with Sammy J)
2013 Sammy J & Randy: The Arena Spectacular (with Sammy J)
2013–2014 The Last Temptation of Randy
2015 An Evening with Sammy J & Randy (with Sammy J)
2015 Randy Writes a Novel 
2016 Sammy J and Randy Land (with Sammy J)
2018 The Book of Randicus
2020 Modus Operandy
2021 Purple Privilege
2022 Inhale, Exile

Television 
2006 The Upper Hand – Short Film (Actor)
2011 The Project – Network 10 (Guest)
2011 Cracker Night – The Comedy Channel (Performer)
2011 Good News World – Network 10 (Cast Member)
2012 Warehouse Comedy – ABC TV (Performer – Sober)
2013 Live on Bowen – Channel 31 (Guest)
2013 No Laughing Matter – The Comedy Channel (Performer)
2014 Community Kitchen – Channel 31 (Guest)
2014 Spicks and Specks – ABC TV (Guest Contestant)
2015 Comedy Up Late – ABC TV (Performer)
2015 Sammy J and Randy in Ricketts Lane – ABC TV (Writer, Actor)
2015 The Chaser's Media Circus – ABC TV (Guest Contestant)
2016 The Yearly with Charlie Pickering – ABC TV ("ABC Business Correspondent")
2019 Bring the Funny - NBC
2020 Aunty Donna's Big Ol' House of Fun – Netflix
2023 De Avondshow met Arjen Lubach – NPO (Guest)

Recordings 
2012 Randy is Sober (DVD)
2012 Sammy J and Randy in Bin Night (DVD)
2013 The Last Temptation of Randy (released as VOD in 2020)
2013 Sammy J & Randy's Difficult First Album (Audio)
2015 Sammy J and Randy LIVE (DVD)
2018 Randy Writes a Novel (DVD, YouTube)
2021 The Book Of Randicus (DVD, VOD)
2021 Purple Privilege (YouTube)
2022 Smug Druggles (YouTube)

Awards and nominations

ARIA Music Awards
The ARIA Music Awards are a set of annual ceremonies presented by Australian Recording Industry Association (ARIA), which recognise excellence, innovation, and achievement across all genres of the music of Australia. They commenced in 1987. 

! 
|-
| 2013 ||Bin Night (with Sammy J) || rowspan="2"| ARIA Award for Best Comedy Release ||  || rowspan="2"| 
|-
| 2015 || Live (with Sammy J) ||  
|-

Winner: Best Comedy, Perth Fringeworld 2014
Winner: Barry Award, Melbourne International Comedy Festival 2010 (with Sammy J)
Winner: Groggy Squirrel Readers Award, Melbourne International Comedy Festival 2010 (with Sammy J)
Nominee: Best Comedy, Adelaide Fringe 2012 (With Sammy J)
Nominee: Golden Gibbo Award: Melbourne Comedy Festival 2009

References

External links 

 Official Site
 YouTube Channel
 Profile at Warehouse Comedy

Australian comedy musicians
Bring the Funny contestants
Comedy theatre characters
Comedy television characters
Male characters in television
Male characters in theatre
Theatre characters introduced in 2005
Television characters introduced in 2005
Puppets